Pauline Kamusewu, also known as just Pauline (born 3 November 1982) is a Swedish soul singer-songwriter of Zimbabwean and Italian descent. Born Pauline Kamusewu in 1982 in Zimbabwe to an Italian father and a Zimbabwean mother, she moved to Sweden when she was three years old. In 2003 she won the Rockbjörnen award for Best Swedish Newcomer. She competed in the second heat of Melodifestivalen 2010 in Sandviken with the song Sucker for Love but was knocked out in the duels by Crucified Barbara.

Discography

Albums

Singles

Featured in
2001: "Tonårstankar" – Lilleman feat. Pauline, Gonza
2009: "Intill dig" – Bo Kaspers Orkester feat. Pauline
2009: "Intill dig" – Bo Kaspers Orkester feat. Pauline
2010: "Six Years" – Tingsek feat. Pauline
2011: "Little Did I Know" – Swingfly feat. Pauline and Christoffer Hiding

References

External links
 Myspace site

1982 births
Living people
21st-century Swedish women singers
21st-century Zimbabwean women singers
Zimbabwean emigrants to Sweden
Zimbabwean people of Italian descent
Swedish people of Italian descent
Swedish people of Zimbabwean descent
Melodifestivalen contestants of 2010